Clovis is a city in and the county seat of Curry County, New Mexico. The city had a population of 37,775 as of the 2010 census, and a 2019 estimated population of 38,319. Clovis is located in the New Mexico portion of the Llano Estacado, in the eastern part of the state.

A largely agricultural community, closely bordering Texas, it is noted for its role in early rock music history and for nearby Cannon Air Force Base. After the discovery of several "Clovis culture" sites in eastern North America in the 1930s, the Clovis people came to be regarded as the first human inhabitants who created a widespread culture in the New World. Clovis people are considered to be the ancestors of most of the indigenous cultures of the Americas. The Atchison, Topeka and Santa Fe Railway system helped establish Clovis over one hundred years ago, which continues to be a major hub of operations for that railroad and its successor, BNSF Railway. Also notable is the Southwest Cheese Company, the largest cheddar cheese producer in North America.

It is the principal city of the Clovis Micropolitan statistical area, which is part of the larger Clovis-Portales CSA.

History
The Eastern New Mexico region was home to the prehistoric Clovis culture, an anthropologically significant group of early Native Americans. Several remains have been found at the Blackwater Draw site (south of Clovis, near Portales), which remains a historical and tourist site.

Clovis began in 1906, when the Atchison, Topeka and Santa Fe Railway was being constructed through the area and railway engineers were instructed to "locate and buy the first level section of land west of Texico" on which to build a town site and railroad facilities. The land was bought on October 2, 1906, and the railroad began offering town lots for sale on May 1, 1907. At first known as "Riley's Switch", the town was reportedly renamed Clovis by the station master's daughter, who was studying about Clovis, the first Catholic king of the Franks, at the time. The settlement built up quickly and in 1909 was incorporated.

On August 24, 2008, eight prisoners escaped from the Clovis Jail by shimmying up plumbing pipes. The escape was highlighted on the television show America's Most Wanted.

Clovis celebrated its centennial in 2009.

The Clovis library was the site of a mass shooting in August 2017 in which two people were killed and four wounded.

Geography

U.S. Routes 60, 70, and 84 pass through the city. The three highways lead east together to the state line at Texico, New Mexico, and Farwell, Texas.

Demographics

As of the census of 2000, there were 32,667 people, 12,458 households, and 8,596 families residing in the city. The population density was 1,458.9 people per square mile (563.3/km). There were 14,269 housing units at an average density of 637.3 per square mile (246.1/km). The racial makeup of the city was 71.3% White, 7.3% Black, 1.0% Native American, 1.6% Asian, 0.1% Pacific Islander, 15.0% from other races, and 3.6% from two or more races. Hispanic or Latino were 33.4% of the population.

There were 12,458 households, out of which 36.3% had children under the age of 18 living with them, 49.8% were married couples living together, 14.9% had a female householder with no husband present, and 31.0% were non-families. 26.8% of all households were made up of individuals, and 10.3% had someone living alone who was 65 years of age or older. The average household size was 2.57 and the average family size was 3.12.

In the city, the population was 30.0% under the age of 18, 9.4% from 18 to 24, 28.1% from 25 to 44, 19.5% from 45 to 64, and 13.0% who were ages 65 or older. The median age was 33 years. For every 100 females, there were 92.5 males. For every 100 females age 18 and over, there were 88.1 males.

The median income for a household in the city was $28,878, and the median income for a family was $33,622. Males had a median income of $26,586 versus $20,375 for females. The per capita income for the city was $15,561. About 17.2% of families and 21.0% of the population were below the poverty line, including 28.2% of those under age 18 and 14.6% of those age 65 or over.

Clovis has a population of 39,860 since the year 2014 and since the year 2000 the population increased by twenty-two percent. The number of males and females in the Clovis population are very close in numbers; there are approximately 20,451 males and 19,409 females. Almost 47% of the population in Clovis is Anglo-Saxon, 42% is Hispanic, 7% is African-American, 2% are two different races, and less than 2% is Asian. Cannon Air Force Base, which is located 10 miles west of the city, has increased the wide variety of people throughout the past several years. The population is spread throughout 22.9 square miles, which compared to other towns nearby, is rather large.

The income for a household, as of 2015, was about $41,000 for the city of Clovis but for the state of New Mexico as a whole, it averaged around $45,382.

Economics and industry

Like most of east-central New Mexico and west Texas, the surrounding area plays host to significant agriculture and ranching activities, including peanut and cotton farming and cattle ranching used for both meat and dairy production. Several processing plants exist for these products; in 2004 construction began on the Southwest Cheese Company plant between Clovis and Portales. The plant commenced operations in late 2005 and provided a small boost to the local economy by employing over 200 personnel. It is one of the largest plants of its type in the world, processing milk provided by the numerous local dairies in excess of 2.3 billion pounds of milk annually.

In 1995, the Santa Fe was merged into the BNSF Railway, which operates a division point and large freight classification yard on its Southern Transcon at Clovis, with a dispatcher's office monitoring traffic over the Belen Cutoff. This  rail corridor is one of the most heavily trafficked routes in the western United States, often with more than 100 mostly intermodal freight trains arriving and leaving Clovis daily. The Southwestern Railroad, formerly the AT&SF Pecos Valley branch line, connects to the BNSF here, shipping potash from mines near Carlsbad.

Clovis is home to Cannon Air Force Base (the 27th Special Operations Wing), Burlington Northern Railroad, the Southwest Cheese Plant, Cummins-Natural Gas Engines, and many locally owned and operated businesses. This community also is surrounded by thousands of acres of farming, ranching, and dairy land. Agriculture is thus a mainstay of the local economy. Many high-school students participate in FFA (Future Farmers of America), where they learn about agriculture. Many local jobs depend on this sector of the economy. According to City-Data.com, the 2016 cost of living index for Clovis was around 83.5, which is well below the national average.

Clovis' location adjacent to Cannon Air Force Base, a special operations base, has had a large impact on the community. Clovis hosts a local organization, the Committee of Fifty, whose stated purpose is to lobby to keep Cannon AFB open; it subsequently helped coordinate the successful campaign which resulted in the realignment of Cannon to its new special ops mission.

Clovis Municipal Airport provides a base for general aviation and daily service by Key Lime Air to and from Denver International Airport and Dallas/Fort Worth International Airport.

In addition to the agricultural, military and railroading sectors, music has contributed to the economy of Clovis almost since the city originated. Norman Petty Studio in Clovis is where several different artists have recorded; one of the most famous is Buddy Holly.

Health care
Plains Regional Medical Center is the primary hospital serving Clovis. It is part of the Presbyterian Healthcare Services based in Albuquerque.

Architecture

Southwest, Spanish Mission, or Adobe architectural styles are prevalent, being considered representative of New Mexico. Much of Clovis architecture is indistinguishable from the group of styles prevalent throughout most small towns and suburbs since the 1930s.

The Hotel Clovis, a local landmark, opened on October 20, 1931. The hotel was designed by architect Robert Merrill, combining an Art Deco exterior with Southwestern Indian interior. The elegant ballroom hosted such names as Louis Armstrong, Glenn Miller, Tommy Dorsey, and Hank Williams, and the nearby train depot supplied the hotel with most of its business. The hotel closed shortly after the Santa Fe Railroad discontinued passenger train service to Clovis in 1971. The building is currently being renovated into affordable housing. As of January 2013, housing is being offered to the community on a first come-first served basis, with some apartments being available now, and others on an "as finished" basis.

Downtown Clovis has three historic movie theaters, including the State Theater.

Climate and landscape

The climate is relatively temperate with low humidity and high winds. Summers are warm with occasional extreme heat and winters are cool with frequent, extreme cold. Severe thunderstorms are often in the spring with rainstorms prevalent during summer evenings. Tornadoes are known to occur and Clovis is located on the southern edge of Tornado Alley. Several inches of snowfall frequently occur each winter, typically for several weeks in January–February, often resulting in minor flooding due to the non-existent runoff system. High winds are common due to the flat, open land and regularly gust well above  and average . According to the Köppen Climate Classification system, Clovis has a semi-arid climate, abbreviated BSk on climate maps.

Education

Public education
Clovis is served by several public schools making up the Clovis Municipal Schools:
 Elementary schools
 Arts Academy at Bella Vista
 Barry Elem.
 Cameo Elem.
 Highland Elem.
 James Bickley Elem.
 La Casita Elem.
 Lincoln-Jackson Pre-School
 Lockwood Elem.
 Los Ninos Pre-School
 Mesa Elem.
 Parkview Elem.
 Ranchvale Elem. [Permanently Closed]
 Sandia Elem.
 Zia Elem.
 Middle schools
 Gattis Middle School
 Marshall Middle School
 Yucca Middle School
 Junior high school
 Clovis High School Freshman Campus
 High school
 Clovis High School

Private schools
 Clovis Christian School
 Eastern Plains Early/Head Start

Post-secondary education
For post-secondary education, there is one community college, Clovis Community College (CCC).

Culture
Clovis is the namesake of stone-age spear points that were found locally in 1929. Clovis points are the characteristically-fluted projectile points associated with the North American Clovis culture. These artifacts date to the Paleoindian period, approximately 13,500 years ago.

The arts
Performances including music and drama often take place at Clovis Community College, Eastern New Mexico University, and the Lyceum Auditorium, as well as at the Special Events Center, located adjacent to the county fairgrounds. The Clovis Music Festival is, locally, a high-profile event held annually at the beginning of September. The Clovis Civic Center hosts this and other entertainment events. The Special Events Center holds events such as rodeos, auctions, and concerts.

The Clovis-Carver Public Library is located downtown and provides many services. Many resources are available to the public such as books, study and research material, DVDs, access to computers and much more. The library also holds many public functions that are free to the public. These functions can include author readings, summer reading programs for children and adults, and holiday programs. There is also a mobile program that delivers books to patrons who are homebound. The Friends of the Library organization holds biannual used book sales to help raise money for library programs.

Popular music

The town achieved some local fame in the 1950s and 1960s when it was home to the Norman Petty Recording Studio, founded by musician Norman Petty, whose "Norman Petty Trio" topped charts with "Mood Indigo" and "Almost Paradise" in their lounge/pop style. Artists such as Buddy Holly, Buddy Knox, Jimmy Gilmer & The Fireballs, and The String-A-Longs had top-charting hits recorded there (Holly's "Peggy Sue" was recorded there in July 1957). Artists including Waylon Jennings, Charlie "Sugartime" Phillips, Bobby Fuller and Roy Orbison cut their earliest recordings at the studio. From the late '50s to the late '60s Petty had recordings on every major label in the U.S. and Canada.

In film
The city served as the principal filming location for the 2016 movie Hell or High Water, which began shooting in May 2015. Three locations in the city were used as banks in the film; the local Suddenlink office at 1106 N Main Street (used in the opening scenes), the Western Bank branch at 901 Pile Street, and an unused, former bank at 2108 N Main Street. A local restaurant, Bill's Jumbo Burger at 2113 N Main Street, was also used in the movie.

Notable people
 D.J. Brigman, PGA Tour golfer
 Dolores Crow, Idaho state legislator
 Hank Baskett III Former NFL player

Nathan Hecht, Chief Justice of the Texas Supreme Court
 Matt Othick, retired NBA player
 Norman Petty, musician, songwriter, record producer

References

External links

 City of Clovis official website
 Clovis Curry County Chamber of Commerce

Cities in New Mexico
Cities in Curry County, New Mexico
Archaeological sites in New Mexico
County seats in New Mexico
Micropolitan areas of New Mexico
Populated places established in 1906
1906 establishments in New Mexico Territory